Peggy Wilson may refer to:

 Peggy Wilson (golfer) (born 1934)
 Peggy Wilson (Alaska politician) (born 1945)
 Peggy Wilson (Louisiana politician) (born 1937)
Peggy Wilson (Actor and Archaeologist) (born 1911)

See also
 Margaret Wilson (disambiguation)